Shanty Town is a 2023 Nigerian crime thriller created by Xavier Ighorodje and Chichi Nworah and produced by Ini Edo and Chi Chi Nworah, the six-part series was released to Netflix on 20 January 2023. The series stars Chidi Mokeme, Ini Edo, Richard Mofe-Damijo, Nse Ikpe-Etim, Sola Sobowale,  Nancy Isime, Shaffy Bello, Ali Nuhu and a host of others.

Synopsis 
Shanty Town follows the story of a ruthless leader named Scar (Chidi Mokeme) who handles a lot of dirty business and is popularly regarded as the King of Shanty Town. Some of the Lagos hustlers who Scar and his associates have held captive has now decided to unite and wage war against him after it was discovered that captives that Scar supposedly sets free are always missing from existence.

Shanty Town is a town for drug dealers, prostitutes, and thugs. A town where crime has its throne. Inem's life is briefly glossed over and replaced by the good things said about her by characters such as Jackie (Mercy Eke) and Mama T (Sola Sobowale) despite the fact that she's the core of the series as intended by the prologue.

Cast 
 Chidi Mokeme as Scar
 Ini Edo as Inem and Idong
 Richard Mofe-Damijo as Chief Fernandez
 Sola Sobowale as Mummy Tornado
 Nse Ikpe-Etim as Ene
 Zubby Michael as Colorado
 Nancy Isime as Shalewa
 Shaffy Bello as Dame Dabola
 Mercy Eke as Jackie
 Ali Nuhu as Accountant
 Uche Jombo as Detective Janice

Episodes

References 

2023 Nigerian television series debuts
English-language Netflix original programming
Television shows set in Lagos